Dimitri Goloubef (1923–1997) was a Canadian football player who played for the Edmonton Eskimos. He previously played football at the University of British Columbia or Simon Fraser University.

References

1923 births
1997 deaths
Canadian football ends
Edmonton Elks players